Carl Leonard Reid (born 14 December 1950 in Hagersville, Ontario, Canada) is a Canadian-born Australian Roman Catholic priest, who is the ordinary of the Personal Ordinariate of Our Lady of the Southern Cross. He is a former bishop of the Anglican Catholic Church of Canada, a Continuing Anglican church within the Traditional Anglican Communion; he was received into the Catholic Church in 2012 and was ordained a priest of the Personal Ordinariate of the Chair of Saint Peter.

Life and ministry 
Reid was a member of the Traditional Anglican Communion. On 27 January 2007, along with Craig Botterill, he was consecrated bishop by the primate, John Hepworth, assisted by Peter Wilkinson and Robert Mercer. This made him a suffragan bishop of the Anglican Catholic Church of Canada and in charge of the province of Ottawa.

In 2009, Pope Benedict XVI promulgated the apostolic constitution Anglicanorum coetibus. In November 2011, Reid became assistant bishop of the Anglican Catholic Church of Canada's pro-diocese of Our Lady of Walsingham, composed of clergy and parishes which were preparing for entry into the future Personal Ordinariate of the Chair of Saint Peter. He was received into the Roman Catholic Church on 15 April 2012. He was received along with Peter Wilkinson and received communion for the first time as a Roman Catholic in a ceremony presided by Monsignor Richard Gagnon at St Andrew's Cathedral in Victoria, British Columbia. The Pope has allowed some married former Anglican priests to be ordained as Roman Catholic priests and Reid was ordained on 26 January 2013 by Archbishop Terrence Prendergast at Notre Dame Cathedral in Ottawa.

Reid became dean of Saint John the Baptist Church and rector of the Congregation of the Annunciation of the Blessed Virgin Mary. In 2014, he was appointed rector of the Congregation of Blessed John Henry Newman Church, now Saint John Henry Newman, in Victoria.

On 26 March 2019, Pope Francis appointed him as the ordinary of the Personal Ordinariate of Our Lady of the Southern Cross in Australia and Japan. Reid's installation was on 27 August 2019 at St Mary's Cathedral, Sydney, by Anthony Fisher, Archbishop of Sydney.

References

1950 births
Living people
Anglican bishop converts to Roman Catholicism
Canadian Anglo-Catholics
21st-century Anglican bishops in Canada
21st-century Canadian Roman Catholic priests
Canadian expatriates in Australia
People of the personal ordinariates